George Selwyn Marryat (20 June 1840 – 14 February 1896) was a country gentleman and British angler most noted for his relationship with F. M. Halford, Francis Francis and the development of dry-fly fishing on the chalk streams of southern England. Upon his death in 1896, he became known as the "Prince of Fly Fishers".

Early life
He was born George Selwyn Marryat on 20 June 1840 at Chewton Glen in the New Forest, Hampshire, England. He was the eldest son of Lieutenant Colonel George Marryat (1806–1871) and Georgiana Charlotte (née Selwyn) Marryat (1816–1860). George was the nephew of Royal Navy officer and novelist Frederick Marryat.

In 1854, Marryat's family moved to Mapperton Manor, Dorset. In Dorset, on the River Frome at Maiden Newton, young Marryat learned to fish with the wet fly. He attended Winchester College from 1854 to 1858. Upon leaving Winchester, George gained a commission as a cornet in the Carabiniers on 16 March 1858. In October 1858, his regiment was posted to Meerut, India, to help quell the Indian Rebellion of 1857. The regiment returned to England in January 1862, and George was promoted, by purchase, to lieutenant. He sold his commission and resigned from the Army in 1865.

Marryat married Lucy Dorothea Clinton (1843 – ?) in St George's, Hanover Square, London on 9 July 1872. They had four daughters: Mary Margaret, Dorothea Charlotte Edith, Joan O. Gladstone, and Alice Lucy. Alice died shortly before her first birthday. The Marryats lived in Edinburgh, Scotland, for two years before moving to Shedfield, Hampshire.

A fly angler
Above all, George Selwyn Marryat was the consummate fly fisherman of his time in England. He was an expert caster, an accomplished, but amateur, chalkstream entomologist, as well as a proficient and innovative fly tyer.

The meeting
What is often referred to as "the meeting that changed the course of fly fishing history" occurred when George Marryat first met a young Frederic M. Halford in Hammond's Fly Shop in Winchester on 28 April 1879. From that introduction came 16 years of collaboration with Halford on all aspects of dry-fly fishing the chalk streams of England.

Development of the floating fly
Marryat wrote virtually nothing about the development the dry fly fishing at the time. However he fished for over a decade at the side of Frederick Halford and together they refined dry fly patterns into lighter, more realistic flies suitable for the equipment of the time. Marryat did share his patterns with Hammond's in London and they made their way into the stocks of commercial flies of the time. In his second book, Dry Fly Fishing: theory and practice (1889), Halford acknowledged his debt to Marryat's innovation and tutelage in the dedication.

Two dry flies of the time designed by and named for Marryat are the "Little Marryat" and "Marryat Quill".

Death
In late January 1896, Marryat fell ill with influenza. Confined to his bed in his house at The Close, Salisbury, Marryat suffered a paralysing stroke that left him unconscious. He died on 14 February 1896. He is buried in the cloister garth of Salisbury Cathedral.

Shortly after Marryat's death, Major W. G. Turle, a close personal friend and noted angler (see Turle knot), wrote in the Fishing Gazette:

References

Further reading
 
 
 
 
 
 
 
 
 

1840 births
1896 deaths
British fishers
Carabiniers (6th Dragoon Guards) officers
Fly fishing
People educated at Winchester College
Deaths from influenza